2046 Leningrad, provisional designation , is a carbonaceous Themistian asteroid from the outer regions of the asteroid belt, approximately 24 kilometers in diameter. It was discovered on 22 October 1968, by Soviet astronomer Tamara Smirnova at the Crimean Astrophysical Observatory in Nauchnij, on the Crimean peninsula. The asteroid was named for the Soviet city of Leningrad (now St. Petersburg).

Orbit and classification 

Leningrad is a member of the Themis family, a dynamical family of carbonaceous asteroids with nearly coplanar ecliptical orbits, located in the outer-belt main. It orbits the Sun at a distance of 2.6–3.7 AU once every 5 years and 7 months (2,048 days). Its orbit has an eccentricity of 0.18 and an inclination of 3° with respect to the ecliptic.

The body's observation arc begins 39 years prior to its official discovery observation, with a precovery taken at Lowell Observatory in October 1929.

Lightcurves 

In August 2012, a rotational lightcurve of Leningrad was obtained from photometric observations by astronomers at the Oakley Southern Sky Observatory. Lightcurve analysis gave a rotation period of 5.296 hours with a brightness variation of 0.11 magnitude.

Diameter and albedo 

According to the surveys carried out by the Japanese Akari satellite, and NASA's Wide-field Infrared Survey Explorer with its subsequent NEOWISE mission, Leningrad measures 23.968 and 27.67 kilometers in diameter and its surface has an albedo of 0.060 and 0.085, respectively.

The Collaborative Asteroid Lightcurve Link assumes a standard albedo for Themistian asteroids of 0.08 and calculates a diameter of 23.55 kilometers based on an absolute magnitude of 11.5.

Naming 

This minor planet was named for Saint Petersburg, the second largest city of Russia after Moscow. During the Soviet Union, the city was named "Leningrad" between 1924 and 1991. It was also called Petrograd during 1914–1924. The approved naming citation was published by the Minor Planet Center on 1 April 1980.

References

External links 
 Asteroid Lightcurve Database (LCDB), query form (info )
 Dictionary of Minor Planet Names, Google books
 Asteroids and comets rotation curves, CdR – Observatoire de Genève, Raoul Behrend
 Discovery Circumstances: Numbered Minor Planets (1)-(5000) – Minor Planet Center
 
 

002046
Discoveries by Tamara Mikhaylovna Smirnova
Named minor planets
19681022